Town & Country Food Stores (T&C) was an employee-owned chain of convenience stores based in San Angelo, Texas. It had over 168 locations spread throughout Texas and New Mexico and yearly revenue in 2006 of over $850 million. It was purchased by Susser Holdings Corporation in 2007 and the stores are undergoing a transition to Stripes Convenience Stores.

History
T&C traces its history back to an earlier chain of the same name, founded in 1959 in Austin, Texas, by Paul Chintamani.  However, during the early 1960s the predecessor chain found itself in financial trouble due to overexpansion.

In 1959, two company employees, H.A. "Harold" Gibbs (a San Angelo native) and F.L. "Steve" Stephens (district manager for the San Angelo area) purchased T&C's six San Angelo stores and one store located in Del Rio, Texas; as part of the purchase, the West Texas company also acquired the T&C name.

Paul Chintamani held a 51% stake in this company.

Susser Holdings buyout 
In September 2007, Susser Holdings of Corpus Christi, Texas, entered into an agreement to purchase Town & Country Food Stores for $361 million.  The close of the transaction expected 90 days following federal approval.  According to newspaper reports in the ''San Angelo Standard-Times', Town & Country stores are expected to be rebranded to Stripes convenience stores.

References

External links
 Town & Country Food Stores
 Stripes Convenience Stores

Companies based in San Angelo, Texas
Economy of the Southwestern United States
Defunct retail companies of the United States
Convenience stores of the United States
Employee-owned companies of the United States
1958 establishments in Texas
American companies established in 1958
Retail companies established in 1958
Retail companies disestablished in 2007
2007 disestablishments in Texas
2007 mergers and acquisitions